A coffer, in architecture, is a sunken panel in a ceiling, soffit or vault.

Coffer may also refer to:

 Coffer (fortification), a hollow lodgement against a dry moat
 Coffer (furniture) or chest, a lockable box for storing valuable items
 Cofferdam, a temporary enclosure used during dam construction
 Safe, also called a coffer, a secure lockable box used for securing valuable objects against theft

See also
 Cofer (disambiguation)